Italy competed at the 1986 European Athletics Championships in Stuttgart, West Germany, from 26 to 31 August 1986.

Medalists

Top eight

Men

Women

See also
 Italy national athletics team

References

External links
 EAA official site 

 

Italy at the European Athletics Championships
Nations at the 1986 European Athletics Championships
1986 in Italian sport